"Ex de Verdad" is a song written and recorded by the American musical duo Ha*Ash. Is the third single of the live album Primera Fila: Hecho Realidad. The single was officially released on May 25, 2015. The music video of the song is the live performance by Ha*Ash in Estudios Churubusco (City México) on 7 July 2014. The song then included on their live album Ha*Ash: En Vivo (2019). It was written by Ashley Grace, Hanna Nicole and Beatriz Luengo.

Background and release 
"Ex de Verdad" was written by Ashley Grace, Hanna Nicole and Beatriz Luengo and produced by George Noriega, Tim Mitchell and Pablo De La Loza. Is a song recorded by American duo Ha*Ash from her live album Primera Fila: Hecho Realidad. It was released as the third single from the album on May 25, 2015, by Sony Music Entertainment.

Music video 
A music video for "Ex de Verdad" was released on May 25, 2015. It was directed by Nahuel Lerena. The video was filmed in Estudios Churubusco, City Mexico. , the video has over 220 million views on YouTube.

The second video for "Ex de Verdad", recorded live for the live album Ha*Ash: En Vivo, was released on December 6, 2019. The video was filmed in Auditorio Nacional, Mexico City.

Commercial performance 
The track peaked at number one on the Monitor Latino and at number 33 in the Mexico Espanol Airplay charts in México.  In March 2019, the songs was certified as Double Platinum in Mexico.

Credits and personnel 
Credits adapted from AllMusic.

Recording and management

 Recording Country: México
 Sony / ATV Discos Music Publishing LLC / Westwood Publishing
 (P) 2014 Sony Music Entertainment México, S.A. De C.V.

Ha*Ash
 Ashley Grace  – vocals, guitar, songwriting
 Hanna Nicole  – vocals, guitar, piano, songwriting
Additional personnel
 Beatriz Luengo  – songwriting
 Antonio Rayo  – songwriting
 Pablo De La Loza  – co-producer, co-director
 George Noriega  – producer
 Tim Mitchell  – producer
 Roberto Collío  – engineer
 Jules Ramllano  – engineer

Charts

Certifications

Awards and nominations

Release history

References 

Ha*Ash songs
Songs written by Ashley Grace
Songs written by Hanna Nicole
Songs written by Rayito
Songs written by Beatriz Luengo
Song recordings produced by George Noriega
Song recordings produced by Tim Mitchell
2015 singles
2014 songs
Spanish-language songs
Pop ballads
Sony Music Latin singles
2010s ballads
Monitor Latino Top General number-one singles